Fall of Eagles is a 13-part British television drama aired by the BBC in 1974. The series was created by John Elliot and produced by Stuart Burge. The series portrays historical events from 1848 to 1918, dealing with the ruling dynasties of Austria-Hungary (the Habsburgs), Germany (the Hohenzollerns), and Russia (the Romanovs). The scriptwriters were: Keith Dewhurst, John Elliot, Trevor Griffiths, Elizabeth Holford, Ken Hughes, Troy Kennedy Martin, Robert Muller, Jack Pulman, David Turner, and Hugh Whitemore.

Overview 
The series tells the story of the final decades of three great empires brought to downfall by historical events. Each empire used an eagle in its heraldry. The central theme is the effects of centuries of despotism, with a lack of social reform and the devastating effects of World War I, that caused revolutionary movements to form. It begins in the aftermath of the Revolutions of 1848 and continues through the Armistice of 11 November 1918, covering about 70 years of history in 13 episodes. The episodes' vignettes move between the three empires: Austria-Hungary, Germany, and Russia.

Episodes

Cast
Cast, in order of first appearance, and sorted by episode and empire. The narrator of the series was Michael Hordern.

Austria-Hungary
Episode 1
Pamela Brown – Archduchess Sophia, mother of Franz Josef
Miles Anderson – young Emperor Franz Josef of Austria
Diane Keen – Elisabeth
Sandor Elès – Count Andrassy
Ann Penfold – Helene, Elisabeth's older sister
Donald Gee – Count Majlath
Kathleen Michael – Princess Hildegard of Bavaria 
Noel Fredericks – Aide to Franz Joseph
Episode 4
Rachel Gurney – older Empress Elisabeth of Austria
Laurence Naismith – older Emperor Franz Joseph
Emrys James – Count Taaffe
Anthony Newlands – Philip of Coburg
James Cossins –  Count Josl Hoyos
Frank Wylie – Police Commissar Gorup
Susan Tracy – Crown Princess Stephanie, Rudolph's wife
Irene Hamilton – Baroness Vetsera, mother of Countess Vetsera
Rosamund Greenwood – Fraulein von Ferenczy, Maid to Elisabeth
Kenneth Benda – Professor Widerhoffer, royal physician
Carleton Hobbs – Abbot Grünböck
Michael Sheard – Losehek, valet to Prince Rudolf
Patrick Durkin – Bratfisch
Vernon Dobtcheff – Count Stookau, uncle of Countess Vetsera
David Neal – Baltazzi
Olaf Pooley – Police President Baron Krauss
Leon Lissek – Police Agent Bayer
John Herrington – Stationmaster
Peter Harcourt-Brown – Gamekeeper
Episode 10
Nora Swinburne – Katharina Schratt
Peter Woodthorpe – Archduke Franz Ferdinand
T. P. McKenna – Count Conrad von Hotzendorf
Michael McStay – Count Count Montenuovo
Neville Barber – Count Paar
Peter Copley – Bethmann-Hollweg
George Merritt – Ketterl
Robert Tayman – First Adjutant
Ian Ricketts – Second Adjutant
Noel Davis – Austrian Ambassador (Count Szögyény)
Brian Hawksley – Sir Arthur Nicolson
Roy McArthur – Archduke Karl
Heather Page – Archduchess Zita
Clyde Pollitt – Kottwitz
Melanie Peck – Maid
Jay Neill – Heller
N/A – Ambassador László Szőgyény-Marich Jr.

German Empire
Episode 2
Gemma Jones – Vicky, oldest child of Victoria
Maurice Denham – Kaiser Wilhelm I
Denis Lill – Fritz
Basil Henson – von Moltke
Geoffrey Chater – Charles
Roger Hammond – Albrecht
Perlita Neilson – young Queen Victoria
Frank Thornton – Prince Albert
Anthony Roye – Dr. Martin
Antony Carrick – Dr. Wegner
Sandra Clark – Wally
Mike Elles – Bertie, young Edward VII
Adam Cunliffe – Willy, young Wilhelm II
 Uncredited – Queen Augusta of Prussia
Episode 3
Curt Jürgens – Otto von Bismarck
Barry Foster – older Kaiser Wilhelm II
Frederick Jaeger – Holstein
Tony Jay – Tsar Alexander III
John Barcroft – Eulenberg
David McKail – Mackenzie, physician
 Valerie Phillips – Dona, Wilhelm II's wife
Episode 13
Barry Foster – older Kaiser Wilhelm II
Marius Goring – Hindenburg
Michael Bates – Ludendorff
Griffith Jones – Hintze
Eve Pearce – Empress Dona
Laurence Hardy – Prince Max
Colin Baker – Crown Prince (Little Willy), son of Wilhelm II
John Robinson – Müller, Admiral
Geoffrey Toone – Groener
Erik Chitty – Hertling, Chancellor
Peter Schofield – Ebert
Kevin Brennan – Count Bentick
Jon Croft – Sergeant

Russian Empire
Episode 5
Gayle Hunnicutt – Alexandra, fiancée of Nicholas II
Charles Kay – Tsar Nicholas II
Patrick Stewart – Ulyanov (Lenin)
Lynn Farleigh – Krupskaya, Lenin's future wife
Freddie Jones – Sergei Witte, Transport Minister
Jan Francis – Mathilde Kschessinska, ballerina
Ursula Howells – Marie, wife of Alexander III
David Collings – Paul Miliukov
Isla Blair – Ella
Robert Brown – Uncle Serge
John Nightingale – Cousin Serge
Howard Rawlinson – Constantin
Mavis Edwards – Queen Victoria
Kevin Stoney – Father John
Denzil Ellis – Wahl
John Sanderson – Young Nicholas
Leila Hart – Singer
Episode 6
Bruce Purchase – von Plehve
Edward Wilson – Martov
Michael Kitchen – Trotsky
Mary Wimbush – Zasulich
Paul Eddington – Plekhanov
Peter Weston – Baumann
David Freedman – Lieber
Julian Fox – Tupuridze
Raymond Witch – Martynov
Svandis Jons –   Maria Alexandrovna Ulyanova
Robert O'Mahoney – Krasikov
Episode 7
Kenneth Colley – Father Gapon
Peter Dyneley – von Bülow
John Turner – Prince Mirsky
John Welsh – Archbishop
Robert Keegan – Ivan Fullon
Michael Golden – Putilov
Roy Sampson – General Alexey Danilov
David Dodimead – Kokovtsev
James Mellor – Kourapatkin
John Quarmby – Lambsdorf
Alan Hockey – Doctor
Glynne Thomas – Spokeswoman
Eileen Helsby – Mother
Roger Nott – Secretary
John Surman – Secretary
Sharon Terry – Tatiana, 2nd daughter
Episode 8
Michael Bryant – Ratchkovsky
David Swift – Trepov
John Stratton – Hesse
David Dodimead – Aleksandr Khvostov
Victor Winding – Azeff
Peter Pratt – Singer
Rio Fanning – Petitioner
Arnold Peters – Clerk
Michael Cotterill – Valet de Chambre
Peter Jolley – Tsar's aide
Desmond Cullum-Jones – Police Sergeant
John Beardmore – Police Inspector
Paul Haley – Medal Sergeant

Episode 9
Peter Vaughan – Isvolsky
Derek Francis – Edward VII
John Bennett – Clemenceau
John Moffatt – Aehrenthal
Frank Middlemass – Stolypin
Andrew Keir – Wickham Steed
Shirley Dixon – Mme. Izvolsky
Tom Criddle – Sir Edward Grey
Ed Devereaux – Purtales
Haydn Wood – Officer
Peter Whitaker – Secretary
Episode 11
Michael Aldridge – Grigory Rasputin
Charles Gray – Rodzianko
John Phillips – Grand Duke Nicholas
Nigel Stock – General Alexeiev
Hugh Burden – Protopopov
Frank Mills – A. F. Trepov
Rosalie Crutchley – Michen
Ann Castle – Ella
Miriam Margolyes – Anna Vyrubova
Piers Flint-Shipman – Alexis
Pippa Vickers – Anastasia
Alix Crista – Maria Golovina
Anthony Collin – Manus
Barbara Keogh – Barbara (Yakovleva)
Martha Nairn – Olga
Hetty Baynes – Tatiana
 Prue Clarke – Marie
Episode 12
Marius Goring – Hindenburg
Michael Bates – Ludendorff
Michael Gough – Helphand
Tom Conti –  Glazkov
Jim Norton – Kerensky
Malcolm Terris – Mieczysław Broński-Warszawski
Esmond Knight – General Ruzski
Alan Cullen – Admiral Henning von Holtzendorff
Basil Clarke – Pyotr Voykov
Ronald Govey – Chkheidze
John Rae – Prince Lvov
Tom Kempinski – Bolshevik Soldier
John Rhys-Davies – Zinoviev
Leonard Fenton –  Nikolai Markov
Eric Carte – Aide to Kaiser
Colin Jeavons – Printer
Isabelle Stanton – Socialist Émigré
Ann Zelda – Helphand's Secretary

Music
The music accompanying the main title and credits is the Trauermarsch (Funeral March), the first movement of Mahler's Symphony No. 5. The closing theme music is the central section from the first movement of Shostakovich's Symphony No. 6.

Reception 
One positive review of the series states: "This ambitious series captivates the audience by depicting the years of revolution, in which the well cemented monarchies of central and eastern Europe slowly disintegrate. However, the show does not attach any sentiments with royalty or the happenings in wake of its collapse."

Media
Fall of Eagles was released on video and DVD in autumn 2004 in the United Kingdom, with the release including a photo gallery and a comprehensive 40-page historical notes booklet written by Andy Priestner providing further details on the historical events and characters in the series. It includes new interviews with Gayle Hunnicutt (The Golden Bowl, Dallas, The Martian Chronicles), Charles Kay (Edge of Darkness, To Serve Them All My Days) and director David Cunliffe (The Onedin Line, The Sandbaggers, Victoria and Albert). It was later released in May 2006 in the United States, without the companion booklet.

A separate book based on the series titled The Fall of Eagles: The Death of the Great European Dynasties by Cyrus Leo Sulzberger II was first published by Crown in 1981.

References

External links

DVD release news
British Film Institute Screen Online

BBC television royalty dramas
BBC television dramas
1974 British television series debuts
1974 British television series endings
1970s British drama television series
Television shows written by John Elliot (author)
World War I television drama series
Television series set in the 19th century
Television series set in the 20th century
Historical television series
English-language television shows
Cultural depictions of Wilhelm II
Cultural depictions of Otto von Bismarck
Cultural depictions of Nicholas II of Russia
Cultural depictions of Vladimir Lenin
Cultural depictions of Leon Trotsky
Cultural depictions of Grigori Rasputin
Cultural depictions of Edward VII
Cultural depictions of Queen Victoria on television
Cultural depictions of Empress Elisabeth of Austria
Cultural depictions of Franz Joseph I of Austria
Cultural depictions of Georges Clemenceau
Cultural depictions of Grand Duchess Anastasia Nikolaevna of Russia
Cultural depictions of Archduke Franz Ferdinand of Austria
Cultural depictions of Paul von Hindenburg
Cultural depictions of Erich Ludendorff
Cultural depictions of Gavrilo Princip
Films set in the Russian Empire
Films set in Austria-Hungary